Southborough station is a commuter rail station on the MBTA Commuter Rail Framingham/Worcester Line, located near the intersection of Cordaville Street and River Street (MA 85) in the Cordaville section of Southborough, Massachusetts. The parking area is located off River Street adjacent to the inbound platform. Passengers use ramps and stairways to access the sidewalk along River Street to cross under the tracks.

History

A station at Southborough was in use by 1838; service lasted until 1960. 

In 1994, service to Worcester was restored as mitigation for delays with reopening the Old Colony Lines. Service initially ran nonstop from Framingham to Worcester, but intermediate park and ride stops were added later as mitigation for delays in reopening the Greenbush Line. The three stations, which together cost $14.2 million, were originally scheduled to open on December 31, 2001. However, they were delayed by several factors, including a debate on whether to build full-length high-level platforms. Those were ruled out because they interfere with freight traffic; instead, smaller "mini-high" platforms plus long low platforms were built.

A shuttle service connecting the station with two locations in Marlborough began on September 16, 2019.

References

External links

MBTA - Southborough
River Street entrance from Google Maps Street View

MBTA Commuter Rail stations in Worcester County, Massachusetts
Southborough, Massachusetts